Carmine Cirella (born January 16, 1960) is a Canadian former professional ice hockey player.

Junior career
Playing for the Peterborough Petes, he won the 1979 Memorial Cup.

Professional career
He was drafted 108th overall by the Detroit Red Wings in the 1979 NHL Entry Draft.  He never played in the National Hockey League, but played 283 games in the American Hockey League.  His career was split between playing for the Adirondack Red Wings and the Maine Mariners.  He also won the Calder Cup twice.

International career
He competed at the 1980 World Junior Ice Hockey Championships.

References

External links

1960 births
Living people
Adirondack Red Wings players
Canadian ice hockey left wingers
Detroit Red Wings draft picks
Hamilton Fincups players
Peterborough Petes (ice hockey) players
Maine Mariners players